Julian Angus Holland (born 1946) is an English author and artist.

He grew up in Gloucester, England and fell in love with the railways at a young age. He regularly enjoyed trainspotting.

Upon leaving school, Holland trained as a graphic designer at Hornsey College of Art. He worked as a designer and an art director for a number of London-based publishing houses. He is a prolific author of works on railways and railway history, as well as on the smaller islands of the British Isles.

Select bibliography

 The mysterious universe (c1979)
 Water under the bridge (1998)
 The concise history encyclopedia (1999)
 Lands of the Southern Cross (c1971)
 Amazing & Extraordinary Railway Facts (David & Charles, 2008)
 Discovering Britain's Little Trains (AA Publishing, 2008)
 Great Railways of the World (AA Publishing, 2008)
 The Lost Joy of Railways (David & Charles, 2009)
 Discovering Scotland's Lost Railways (Waverley Books, 2009)
 More Amazing & Extraordinary Railway Facts (David & Charles, 2010)
 Discovering Scotland's Lost Local Lines (Waverley Books, 2010)
 The Lost Lines of Britain (AA Publishing, 2010)
 Steaming Across Britain (AA Publishing, 2011)
 Amazing & Extraordinary Facts: Trains & Railways (David & Charles, 2011)
 Mapping the Railways; with David Spaven (Times Books, 2011)
 Railway Days Out (AA Publishing, 2012)
 Amazing & Extraordinary Facts: Steam Age (David & Charles, 2012)
 Britain's Scenic Railways (Times Books, 2012)
 Dr Beeching: 50 Years On (David & Charles, 2013)
 An A-Z of Famous Express Trains (David & Charles, 2013)
 Exploring Britain's Lost Railways (Times Books, 2013)
 Railway Day Trips (Collins, 2014)
 Great Railway Journeys of the World (Times Books, 2014)
 History of Britain's Railways (Times Books, 2015)
 Lost Railway Walks (Collins, 2016)
 All Aboard (The Times) (Harper Collins, 2021)

References

British non-fiction writers
Artist authors
1946 births
Living people